Milan Lučanský (10 February 1969 – 30 December 2020) was a Slovak police officer who was the President of police of Slovak Police Force from 31 May 2018 to 31 August 2020.

Death 
29th of December, Lučasnký was supposed to visit a psychologist, this examination didn't imply that he would want to commit suicide. At 16:30, his cell was checked. At 16:39 it was noticed that he didn't take his food and at 16:40 his cell was opened and a attempt of saving his life began. Rescuers managed to revive him and he was transferred to University hospital with polyclinic J. A. Reiman in Prešov. Lučanský have died a day after he tried hanging himself in his cell on 30th of December 2020.

See also
 List of presidents of the Slovak Police Force
 Slovak Police Force

References

1969 births
2020 deaths
Slovak police officers
People from Poprad
Matej Bel University alumni
Chiefs of police